Ceramidiodes is a genus of moths in the subfamily Arctiinae. It contains the single species Ceramidiodes obscurus. It is found in Brazil.

References

External links
 Ceramidiodes at Butterflies and Moths of the World, Natural History Museum

Moths described in 1877
Arctiinae
Moth genera
Taxa named by George Hampson